The 1984 United States Senate election in New Mexico took place on November 6, 1984. Incumbent Republican U.S. Senator Pete Domenici successfully ran for re-election to a third term, defeating Democrat Judith Pratt.

Republican primary

Candidates 
 Pete Domenici, incumbent U.S. Senator

Democratic primary

Candidates 
 Anselmo A. Chavez, military veteran
 Nick Franklin, former state Democratic Party chairman
 Judith Pratt, state representative

Results

General election

Results

See also 
  United States Senate elections, 1984

References 

New Mexico
1984
1984 New Mexico elections